Cô Sao ("Miss Sao") is a 1965 Vietnamese-language western-style opera by the composer Đỗ Nhuận. It is usually regarded as the first opera in Vietnamese.

References

Vietnamese-language operas
1965 operas
Operas
Vietnamese plays